"As I Lay Me Down" is a song recorded by Swedish singer Wiktoria, written by Justin Forrest, Jonas Wallin, and Lauren Dyson and produced by Didrik Franzen. The song was released as a digital download in Sweden on 25 February 2017 and peaked at number 2 on the Swedish Singles Chart.

It took part in Melodifestivalen 2017, and qualified to the final from the fourth semi-final on 25 February 2017. Being the heavy favorite to win, it placed only sixth in the final; eight with the international juries and second with the Swedish public. Although not winning the contest, it eventually became the biggest hit out of the participating entries, beating the winner "I Can't Go On" and runner-up "Hold On". When Swedish radio station Rix FM asked its listeners in late 2019 to rank the 100 best songs of the 2010s, the song ranked 59th; out of the Melodifestivalen entries on the list, only contest winners "Heroes" (5th) and "Euphoria" (15th) ranked higher, which titles "As I Lay Me Down" as the most successful Melodifestivalen entry of the decade not to win the actual competition.

Track listing

Chart performance

Weekly charts

Year-end charts

Release history

References

2017 singles
2016 songs
English-language Swedish songs
Melodifestivalen songs of 2017
Swedish pop songs
Wiktoria Johansson songs
Songs written by Lauren Dyson